The University of Commercial Sciences (UCC), is a private university located in Managua, Nicaragua which was founded in 1964.

History
In 1964, Carlos Narváez Moreira founded the Institute of Commercial Sciences, which later became the Center of Commercial Sciences, offering a technical degree in Accountancy and Finance. In the following years the academic offering was expanded to include courses in Senior Technical Executive Secretariat, Business Executive, Public Relations Executive and Marketing and Advertising.

On April 3, 1997, the National University Council changed the classification of the UCC from a Superior Technical Education Center to a university.

References

External links
 

Buildings and structures in Managua
Universities in Nicaragua